The Bacillales are an order of Gram-positive bacteria, placed within the Bacillota.  Representative genera include Bacillus, Listeria and Staphylococcus.

See also
 List of bacteria genera
 List of bacterial orders

References 

 
Gram-positive bacteria
Bacilli